Andriy Oleksandrovych Malashchuk (born 15 February 1999) is a Ukrainian professional footballer who plays as a central midfielder for Ukrainian club Nyva Ternopil.

References

External links
 
 

1999 births
Living people
People from Pidvolochysk
Ukrainian footballers
Association football midfielders
FC Ahrobiznes Volochysk players
FC Nyva Ternopil players
Ukrainian First League players
Ukrainian Second League players
Ukrainian Amateur Football Championship players
Sportspeople from Ternopil Oblast